Alexander Ivanovich Dovgopol (born November 12, 1965) is a Russian politician, lawyer and businessman. On June 6, 2013, he became the head of the Perovo District. He is a member of United Russia.

Early life 
Alexander Dovgopol was born on November 12, 1965 in the village of Barakhta Kiev region. In Moscow External University of Humanities he received yurist. Takzhe profession received higher professional education at the Moscow Institute of national and regional relations. He attended Moscow External University of Humanities. He has higher professional education in law.

Career 
In 2008, Alexander was appointed head of the municipal formation of intra-municipal entity Perovo in Moscow. In 2012, in connection with the re-election of deputies of the municipal assembly of the municipality of intra Perovo in Moscow, he was reappointed as Perovo head. On June 6, 2013 he was appointed head of the district council Perovo Moscow City.

Positions 

Deputy district municipality Perovo
 Head of the district council Perovo
 Deputy Municipal Assembly of the municipality of intra Perovo
 Head of the municipal formation of intra-municipal entity Perovo

Personal life 
Alexander Dovgopol is married with one daughter.

Controversy 
At a May 18, 2016 meeting, in response to a question about the construction of the Moscow district of Perovo chord near the houses, the destruction of trees, the noise and dirt, Dovgopol formally proposed that Muscovites sell their apartment and move away. Residents complained to Sergey Sobyanin.

On January 29, 2016, he issued a complaint against his daughter and her common law husband and sister. His daughter claimed that she had an alibi and additional evidence of the incident.

References

External links 
 Biography
 Biography on the site area Perovo

1965 births
Living people
United Russia politicians
People from Kyiv Oblast